Jayne Vanessa Armstrong (fl. 1996) is a British botanist who challenged the two-species taxonomy of British elms proposed by fellow Cambridge alumnus Richard Hook Richens in 1984. Armstrong in her Ph.D. thesis proposed a classification featuring 40 species, subspecies and microspecies. An introduction to her work was later published in the Botanical Journal of the Linnean Society as part of a series which was not forthcoming. However, her classification formed the basis of that adopted by Sell and Murrell in their Flora of Great Britain and Ireland, published in 2018.

Publications
Armstrong, J. V. & Sell, P. D. (1996). A revision of the British elms (Ulmus L., Ulmaceae): the historical background. Bot. J. Linn. Soc. 120: 39–50.
Armstrong, J, Gibbs, J, Webber, J, and Brasier, C. 1997. Elm Workshop Proceedings. Elm Newsletter No. 1. April 1997. The Conservation Foundation.

References

Armstrong J. V.
Living people
Women botanists
20th-century British women scientists
Year of birth missing (living people)
Place of birth missing (living people)